Triodetic dome is a partial dome structure that is similar but different from geodesic dome in that it is not a full sphere.

Examples

 Bloedel Floral Conservatory, Vancouver British Columbia, Canada
 Rainbow Stage, Winnipeg, Manitoba, Canada
 Cinesphere, Toronto, Ontario, Canada
 Turtle Dome (Strongheart Recreation Center), Grand Travers, Michigan, US
 Meadowbank Gold Project, Kivalliq District, Nunavut, Canada

See also

Cloud Nine (tensegrity sphere)
Concrete dome
Domed city
Fullerenes, molecules which resemble the geodesic dome structure
Geodesic airframe
Geodesic grid
Geodesic tents
Gridshell
Hoberman sphere
Hugh Kenner, who wrote Geodesic Math and How to Use It
Monolithic dome
Pentakis dodecahedron
Radome
Shell structure
Silent Running 1972 science fiction film prominently featuring geodesic domes.
Space frames
Stepan Center
Synergetics
Truncated icosahedron
Truss

Triodetic dome